Below is a list of characters, along with descriptions, from the BBC sitcom 2point4 Children. The show aired on BBC1 between 1991 and 1999.

Main cast

Bill Porter
Wilhelmina "Bill" Porter (Belinda Lang) is wife to Ben and mother to Jenny and David. During series 1 she and Rona work at a bakery but they resign due to sexual harassment from their boss. From series 2 onwards she runs a catering company with Rona.

Ben Porter
Ben Porter (Gary Olsen) is the father of the Porter family. He is a self-employed plumber, sometimes assisted by Christine. He is laid-back with a childish sense that gets on Bill's nerves. Ben, along with David, is a Tottenham Hotspur supporter.

Jenny Porter
Jenny Porter (Georgina Cates (Series 1-2) then Clare Buckfield (Series 3-8)) is the daughter of the Porter family. She frequently attempts to visit her boyfriend, Jason, which is hampered due to Bill's over-restrictive nature. Halfway through the first series, Jenny becomes a vegetarian. In the last series she leaves for university.

David Porter
David Porter (John Pickard) is the son of the Porter family. His interests include horror movies, aliens and heavy metal. He frequently annoys his older sister, Jenny.

Rona Harris
Rona Harris (Julia Hills) is Bill's best friend. In series 1 she works with Bill at a bakery until they both resign due to sexual harassment. From series 2 she runs a catering company with Bill. From series 3 she begins a relationship with DJ Tony. The later series focus on her attempts to have children, and, after considering adoption, Rona announces she is pregnant in the final episode.

Christine Atkins
Christine (Kim Benson) is Ben's sarcastic and moody plumbing assistant. In the first series she works on the meat counter in a supermarket, before becoming Ben's plumbing assistant in the second series.

Recurring characters

Jake Klinger
Jake Klinger (Roger Lloyd-Pack) is a fellow plumber and rival of Ben. He is nicknamed "The Klingon" due to his love of Star Trek.

Bette
Bill's opinionated, chain-smoking widowed mother, who lives in Suffolk. (Liz Smith)

Aunt Belle
Bette's twin sister and Bill's aunt. (Liz Smith)

Aunt Pearl
Rona's biological mother. (Barbara Lott)

Aunt Tina
Ben's sister. (Patricia Brake/Sandra Dickinson)

Declan
Declan (Mitchell Ray) meets the Porters in series 7's last episode after he and a group of other children break into Ben's van when he and Bill drop Jenny off at university. After learning he is homeless, Bill and Ben sympathise with him. In series 8 he is portrayed by Alex Kew, and is fostered by the Porters and moves in with them.

BBC-related lists
Lists of British sitcom television characters